The Cornish House is a historic house at 1800 Arch Street in Little Rock, Arkansas.  It is a -story brick structure, with a side gable roof, and a project center gable at the front, sheltering a porch with granite balustrade and posts.  A porte-cochere extends north of the building, and a sunroom south.  The house was built in 1917 to a design by noted Arkansas architect Theodore Sanders, and is a well-preserved local example of Tudor Revival architecture.

The house was listed on the National Register of Historic Places in 1982.

See also
National Register of Historic Places listings in Little Rock, Arkansas

References

Houses on the National Register of Historic Places in Arkansas
Tudor Revival architecture in Arkansas
Houses completed in 1917
Houses in Little Rock, Arkansas
National Register of Historic Places in Little Rock, Arkansas
Historic district contributing properties in Arkansas